Erland Cooper is a Scottish composer, producer and multi-instrumentalist. He was born and raised in Stromness, Orkney. As an interdisciplinary artist, he has released three acclaimed studio albums, with four additional companion albums and multiple EPs, including a trilogy of work inspired by his childhood home, as well as themes of nature, people, place and time. His work combines field recordings with classical orchestration and contemporary electronic elements. Cooper also works across mixed media projects including installation art, theatre and film. He is a recipient of a Royal Television Society award and his music is played frequently on BBC Radio 3 and BBC Radio 6 Music as well as featured on various TV network productions.

He is credited by Mojo Magazine with exploring the concept of psychogeography, connecting identity, memory, and place through music, words and cinematography. He explores these themes further by partnering with well-known artists and writers in his work and live shows.

In 2021 he buried the only existing copy of the master magnetic tape of his first classical album in Orkney, deleting all digital files and leaving only a treasure hunt of clues for fans and his record label alike to search for it. He buried the tape in early spring 2021 and intended to retrieve and release it in 2024. After a year and half in the soil, the tape was found in late autumn, September 2022 by two amateur sleuths

Originally founding member of bands The Magnetic North and Erland and the Carnival with whom he has released five studio albums, he has a diverse musical background. He owns a private recording studio in London.

Music career

Erland and the Carnival

In 2009, Cooper co-founded the band Erland and the Carnival in London with multi-instrumentalist Simon Tong.

The Magnetic North

In 2011 Cooper co-founded the British shoegaze band The Magnetic North with Simon Tong and singer, composer and orchestral arranger Hannah Peel. Formed in London, they released their debut album, Orkney: Symphony of the Magnetic North on 6 May 2012. Cooper said that the inspiration for the album came from an appearance of long dead Betty Corrigall in one of his dreams, insisting that he wrote an album about his home. This theme is currently being developed into a stage production.

Solo career
Cooper released his debut solo album Solan Goose, heavily influenced by native Orcadian birds, on 23 March 2018. The album is the first of a triptych that reflects on the natural world surrounding Orkney, with its tracks each taking their titles from Orcadian dialect words for birds.

Cooper's second album in the triptych, Sule Skerry, was released on 24 May 2019 on Phases.  The album was included on the Scottish Album of The Year shortlist for 2020. 

In 2022, Cooper provided a soundtrack, Music For Growing Flowers, to the Superbloom wildflower meadow installation within the moat of the Tower of London. The music has also been released as an album and a score.

Writing credits
Cooper is best known for his contemporary arrangements of traditional Scottish and English folk songs, including most notably "Love Is a Killing Thing" and "The Derby Ram" collected by Ralph Vaughan Williams but he has also written for established artists.

Discography

With Erland & the Carnival

Studio albums
2009: Was You Ever See EP
2010: Erland & the Carnival
2010: Trouble in Mind EP
2011: Nightingale – #21 on UK Indie Chart
2014: Closing Time

With Magnetic North
Studio albums
2012: Orkney: Symphony of the Magnetic North
2016: Prospect of Skelmersdale

As a solo artist
Studio albums
2018: Solan Goose
2019: Sule Skerry
2020: Hether Blether
2021: Holm (Variations & B-sides)
2021: The Island 1961
2022: Music For Growing Flowers

Companion albums
2018: Murmuration (with William Doyle)
2019: Seachange (with Leo Abrahams)
2020: Landform (with Marta Salogni)

EPs
2018: Nightflight
2020: Eynhallow
2021: Never Pass Into Nothingness
2021: Egilsay

Other recordings
2009: What the Folk Compilation Vol. 2 by Youth (Butterfly Recordings) – track "Coming Home"

Further reading

References

External links

Erland Cooper's Orkney. On Open Country, BBC, 16 June 2022

Scottish composers
Scottish male guitarists
21st-century Scottish male singers
Scottish songwriters
Living people
Scottish folk musicians
People from Orkney
Erland and the Carnival members
Year of birth missing (living people)
The Magnetic North members